Yvonne McGuinness (born 12 October 1972) is an Irish visual artist who works in a variety of contexts, including video installation and print. Born in Kilkenny, Ireland, and now based in Monkstown, County Dublin, her works have been shown in Ireland and the UK, and she holds an MA from the Royal College of Art in London.

A 2004 biography stated, "Recent works have been preoccupied with notions of portrayal of the self and with deception, dealing with the sublimated desire for self-expression of the artist and the tension between revelation and concealment."

She has made several short films: This is between us (2011), Charlie's Place (2012), and Procession (2012).

Personal life
In 2004, McGuinness married her long-time boyfriend Cillian Murphy, with whom she has two sons, born in December 2005 and July 2007 respectively. She is the niece of Fianna Fáil politician John McGuinness.

References

External links 
 
 Procession (2012) video clip
 This is between us (2011) video

Irish women artists
1972 births
Living people
People from Kilkenny (city)